Iván Calderón Pérez (March 19, 1962 – December 27, 2003) was a Puerto Rican professional baseball outfielder. He played in Major League Baseball (MLB) for four teams from 1984 to 1993, and was named an All-Star in 1991. Nicknamed "Ivan the Terrible", Calderón was killed in a shooting in Puerto Rico in December 2003.

Professional career
Calderón was signed by the Seattle Mariners as an undrafted free agent on July 30, 1979. He began his minor league career in 1980 with the Bellingham Mariners, a farm team of the Mariners. Calderón reached the Triple-A level in 1984.

Seattle Mariners
Calderón made his major league debut on August 10, 1984. In 11 games with the Mariners that season, he batted .208 with one home run and one run batted in (RBI). Calderón went on to appear in 67 games with Seattle in 1985, and 37 games in 1986. Overall in parts of three seasons with the Mariners, he batted .263 with 11 home runs and 42 RBIs in 115 games.

Chicago White Sox
Midway through the 1986 season, Calderón was sent to the Chicago White Sox, being the player to be named later in an earlier trade that had sent catcher Scott Bradley to the Mariners. Calderón was a regular starter for Chicago in three seasons (1987, 1989, and 1990) with at least 144 appearances in each of those seasons. He hit a career-high 28 home runs in 1987 and a career-high 87 RBIs in 1989.

Montreal Expos
After the 1990 season, Calderón was acquired by the Montreal Expos, in a multi-player deal that sent Tim Raines to the White Sox. The Expos raised Calderón's salary to over $2 million a season, and he earned a spot on the National League's roster for the 1991 MLB All-Star Game. He batted 1-for-2 in the All-Star Game, and had a stolen base. Calderón batted a career-high .300 during the 1991 season. Injuries during 1992 limited him to 48 games with Montreal that year. Overall in two seasons with the Expos, Calderón batted .291 with 22 home runs and 99 RBIs in 182 games.

Boston Red Sox
After the 1992 season, Calderón was traded to the Boston Red Sox in exchange for major-league pitcher Mike Gardiner and minor-league pitcher Terry Powers. In 73 games with the 1993 Red Sox, Calderón batted .221 with one home run and 19 RBIs. Boston released Calderón on August 17, 1993.

Chicago White Sox (second stint)
Calderón returned to the White Sox, who signed him on August 31, 1993. In nine games late in the 1993 season, his final professional appearances, he batted .115 (3-for-26) with three RBIs. During parts of six seasons with the White Sox (1986–1990 and 1993), Calderón batted .273 with 70 home runs and 284 RBIs in 554 games.

Career totals
Calderón was a career .272 hitter with 104 home runs and 444 RBIs in 924 major-league games. Defensively, he was primarily an outfielder (755 games), split nearly evenly between right field (382 games) and left field (377 games), with 11 appearances as a center fielder. He also made 32 appearances as a first baseman, and was the designated hitter in 105 games. As an outfielder, he had a .976 fielding average.

Death
On December 27, 2003, Calderón was shot multiple times in the head and back, at point-blank range, with a .45 calibre weapon while at a bar in Loiza, Puerto Rico. , his murder remained unsolved. At the time of his death, Calderón and his wife had two children; he also had five other children from other relationships.

See also

 List of Major League Baseball players from Puerto Rico
 List of unsolved murders

References

Further reading

External links

1962 births
2003 deaths
People from Fajardo, Puerto Rico
Major League Baseball left fielders
Major League Baseball right fielders
Major League Baseball players from Puerto Rico
Puerto Rican expatriate baseball players in Canada
National League All-Stars
Boston Red Sox players
Chicago White Sox players
Montreal Expos players
Seattle Mariners players
Bellingham Mariners players
Buffalo Bisons (minor league) players
Calgary Cannons players
Chattanooga Lookouts players
Salt Lake City Gulls players
Wausau Timbers players
West Palm Beach Expos players
2003 murders in Puerto Rico
Deaths by firearm in Puerto Rico
Male murder victims
Puerto Rican murder victims
People murdered in Puerto Rico
Unsolved murders in the United States